Batiashvili may refer to:

 Lisa Batiashvili, a Georgian violinist
 Irakli Batiashvili, a Georgian politician
 Guram Batiashvili, a Georgian writer